Shaun Elliott (born 26 January 1957) is an English former professional footballer.

Career
Elliott was a central defender who began his career with Sunderland before playing for Norwich City, Blackpool and Colchester United. He also played with the Seattle Sounders in the North American Soccer League. He ended his professional career in the United States in 1991, playing 13 times without scoring for the Albany Capitals in the American Professional Soccer League.

Elliott was captain at Sunderland and led them to the 1985 Milk Cup final, but missed the match through suspension. Sunderland lost the final to Norwich City, who went down to the Second Division with them that season.

While with Sunderland, Elliott won three caps for the England 'B' team.

Honours

Club
Sunderland
 Football League Second Division Runner-up (1): 1979–80

Colchester United
 Football Conference Winner (1): 1991–92
 Football Conference Runner-up (1): 1990–91

References

Career information at ex-canaries.co.uk

APSL 1991 Season

1957 births
Living people
Albany Capitals players
American Professional Soccer League players
Blackpool F.C. players
Colchester United F.C. players
England B international footballers
English expatriate footballers
English expatriate sportspeople in the United States
English footballers
Expatriate soccer players in the United States
North American Soccer League (1968–1984) players
Norwich City F.C. players
People from Haltwhistle
Footballers from Northumberland
Seattle Sounders (1974–1983) players
Sunderland A.F.C. players
Association football defenders